The women's 100 metres event at the 2008 African Championships in Athletics was held at the Addis Ababa Stadium on April 30–May 1.

Medalists

Results

Heats
Qualification: First 3 of each heat (Q) and the next 4 fastest (q) qualified for the semifinals.

Wind: Heat 1: -2.0 m/s, Heat 2: -0.7 m/s, Heat 3: -0.7 m/s, Heat 4: -3.1 m/s

Semifinals
Qualification: First 3 of each semifinal (Q) and the next 2 fastest (q) qualified for the final.

Wind: Heat 1: +0.3 m/s, Heat 2: +0.8 m/s

Final
Wind: +0.1 m/s

References
Results (Archived)

2008 African Championships in Athletics
100 metres at the African Championships in Athletics
2008 in women's athletics